Adriana Konjarski (born 11 October 1995) is an Australian women's association football player who plays for Newcastle Jets in the A-League Women.

Personal life
Jones is the daughter of former NSL player and former Newcastle Jets head coach Mark Jones.

Club career
Newcastle Jets

Newcastle Jets 
Jones signed for Newcastle Jets in 2013. After a season off, Jones re-joined Newcastle Jets in October 2015.

Adelaide United
Jones joined Adelaide United ahead of the 2016–17 season. Jones go on to nine goals during her first season for Adelaide. Jones also completed a hat trick during the 12th round clash against Western Sydeny Wanderers.

Zhuhai Suoka Guangdong Football Club 
Jones would go onto spending some time at the Chinese outfit before returning to Adelaide for the 2017–18 season. She would go on to score 13 times while playing in China.

Melbourne City 
Jones would go on to join her third W-League side for the 2018–19 season for Melbourne City.

South Melbourne 
For the 2019 WNPL season, Jones signed for the former NSL side, South Melbourne. Debuting against Bulleen Lions, Jones would go on to score for her latest club the following game very early on against Senior NTC.

Return to Newcastle Jets 
In October 2022, following a break-out season in the second tier with Warners Bay, Konjarski returned to the professional level, returning to her first club, Newcastle Jets.

References

Living people
Australian women's soccer players
Newcastle Jets FC (A-League Women) players
Adelaide United FC (A-League Women) players
Melbourne City FC (A-League Women) players
A-League Women players
Women's association football forwards
1995 births